Murrumu Walubara Yidindji (born 1974), also known by his former western name Jeremy Geia, is a Yidindji man, former journalist, and Australian Aboriginal activist. He is the foreign affairs minister of the Sovereign Yidindji Government micronation, having renounced his Australian citizenship in 2014.

Geia was born in Cairns in 1974 to an Aboriginal mother and Croatian Jewish father. In 1999, he won the NAIDOC Youth of the Year award. In 2001 Geia symbolically declared the "Peoples Democratic Republic of Palm Island" independent from Australia.

Geia was an NITV and SBS journalist, who was part of the Canberra Press Gallery. In 2012 he became the first western journalist to obtain an interview with Julian Assange at the Ecuadorian embassy in London. He left his job when he renounced Australian citizenship.

Geia was charged by police in May 2015 after being caught driving a car with a license and registration plates issued by the Yidindji government.

References

Living people
Australian indigenous rights activists
Australian journalists
Micronational leaders
1974 births
People from Cairns
Australian people of Croatian-Jewish descent